The Commonwealth of Australia is a Form 18-K United States SEC registered entity representing the nation of Australia for the purpose of issuing securities in the US market. Form 18-K registrations are used only for foreign government registrations with the SEC and do not create a corporation. Although digitally available filings date back to 2002, attention was brought to it following the 2008 Global Financial Crisis and the subsequent introduction of the deposit guarantee scheme under the Rudd government. If an institution covered by the scheme were to collapse, the Australian Government would, at its discretion, issue debt securities that would be subject to US laws and financial regulations. As of 2020, Australia has yet to issue any securities related to the deposit guarantee scheme through the entity.

The registration has been subject to various conspiracy theories. Most relate to the idea that Australia ceased being a sovereign nation following the formation of a "Corporate" entity, or that the entity violates the Australian constitution. These conspiracies are baseless; the registration of Australia utilized Form 18-K and did not create a corporate entity and this does not violate Australia's sovereignty. US regulations and laws would only apply to operations done in the US, that is, only securities issued in the US would be subject to US regulations.

References 

Commonwealth Government-owned companies of Australia
Rudd Government
2009 establishments in the United States
Securities (finance)
Economy of Australia